Marie Chouinard OC (born 14 May 1955) is a Canadian dancer, choreographer, and dance company director.

Life and work

In 1978, Chouinard presented her first work, Crystallization. After 12 years as a solo performer and choreographer, Chouinard founded her own company in 1990, the Compagnie Marie Chouinard. In 1988, Chouinard, along with Wim Vandekeybus and Mark Tompkins, introduced the ImPulsTanz Vienna International Dance Festival. Her son is actor Théodore Pellerin.

Performances and solo works 
 1978 : Cristallisation
 1979 : Cristallisation (les 5 cycles)
 1979 : Dimanche matin, mai 1955
 1979 : Danse pour un homme habillé de noir et qui porte un revolver
 1979 : 5 Chorégraphies pour le public pieds nus
 1979 : Les oeufs, ou autrefois il y avait, il y a longtemps, au temps où...
 1980 : Voyages dans les limbes
 1980 : Auto-portrait no 1
 1980 : Auto-portrait no 2
 1980 : Petite danse sans nom
 1980 : Les Grenouilles
 1980 : Mimas, Lune de Saturne
 1980 : La Leçon
 1980 : Dislocations
 1980 : Chanson de gestes
 1980 : Quelques façons d'avancer tranquillement vers toi
 1980 : Jaune
 1980 : Récréation
 1980 : Dimanche matin, mai 2005
 1980 : Conversations
 1981 : Plaisir de tous les sens dans tous les sens
 1981 : Danseuse-performeuse cherche amoureux ou amoureuse pour la nuit de 1er juin
 1982 : Meat meets meat, avec Claude-Marie Caron
 1982 : Marie Chien Noir (Mimas, Lune de Saturne; Chien Noir et Plaisirs de tous les sens dans tous les sens)
 1984 : Table of Contents I
 1985 : Chebre, avec Claude-Marie Caron
 1985 : Earthquake in the Heartchakra; Table of Contents II
 1986 : Drive in the Dragon; Crue; S.T.A.B.(Space, Time and Beyond)
 1987 : L'Après-midi d'un faune
 1988 : Biophilia
 1989 : Poèmes d'atmosphère
 1990 : Lettre ouverte à Terpsichore
 1992 : Endangered species; Cet instant-ci et l'éternité; Terpsichore a cappella
 2010 : Lingam, Campagne
 2012 : In Museum

Choreography works 
 1991 : Les Trous du ciel
 1993 : The Rite of the Spring
 1994 : Prelude to the afternoon of a faun
 1996 : L’Amande et le diamant
 1998 : Les Solos 1978-1998
 1998 : 
 1998 : Humanitas
 1999 : Des feux dans la nuit
 1999 : 24 Preludes by Chopin
 2000 : Le Cri du monde
 2001 : Étude no 1
 2003 : Chorale
 2005 : Mouvements
 2005 : bODY_rEMIX/gOLDBERG_vARIATIONS
 2008 : Orpheus and Eurydice
 2009 : morning glories
 2010 : The Golden Mean (Live)
 2012 : Henri Michaux: Mouvements
 2013 : Gymnopédies

Works in repertory of other companies 
 2003 :   Prelude to the afternoon of a faun and The Rite of the Spring/Ballet Gulbenkian, Portugal
 2008 :   24 preludes by Chopin/ Ballet national de Toronto, Canada
 2009 :   Prelude to the afternoon of a faun/São Paulo Companhia de Dança, Brésil

Film 
 2003 : Cantique no 1
 2008 : bODY_rEMIX/gOLDBERG_vARIATIONS (produced by Amérimage-Spectra and realized by Marie Chouinard)

Multiscreen film 
 2003 : Cantique no 2

Installations 
 2004 : Cantique no 3 (participative installation created with Louis Dufort)
 2009 : Icônes (video installation created with Luc Courchesne)

Bibliography 
Monographs
2008 : Chantier des extases (poetry), les Éditions du passage (Montréal)

2010 : Compagnie Marie Chouinard, Les Éditions du passage (Montréal)

2010 : morning glories :)-(:, Editions Compagnie Marie Chouinard

Awards and distinctions 
 1981 - Studio du Québec à New York (Gouvernement du Québec), first recipient awarded to Marie Chouinard
 1986 - Prize Jacqueline-Lemieux awarded to Marie Chouinard
 1987 - Jean A. Chalmers awarded to Marie Chouinard
 1993 - Prize Artist Lifetime Achievement awarded to Marie Chouinard
 1994 - Prize Boat Award (Glasgow, Scotland) for The Rite of the Spring
 2000 - Bessie Award for sustained achievement (New York) awarded to Marie Chouinard
 2003 - The French Society of Dramatic Authors and Composers award SACD, Paris
 2003 - The movie Cantique no 1 receives a prize at the Moving Pictures Festival of Danse on Film and Video, Toronto (performance prize for Carol Prieur and Benoît Lachambre)
 2003 - National Arts Center Award, a companion award of the Governor General's Performing Arts Awards
 2006 - Archanget Award for Le vol de Lindbergh and Les 7 Péchés capitaux, choreographed by Marie Chouinard, Edinburgh Festival
 2006 - Grand Prix du Conseil des Arts de Montreal for the Company's impact on Montreal dance and is workbODY_rEMIX/gOLDBERG_vARIATIONS
 2007 - Officier of the Ordre of Canada awarded to Marie Chouinard
 2009 - Gemini Award (Best Performance in a Performing Arts Program or Series) awarded to Compagnie Marie Chouinard dancers for their performance in the movie bODY_rEMIX/gOLDBERG_vARIATIONS
 2009 - Chevalier of the Ordre des Arts et des Lettres of France awarded to Marie Chouinard
 2010 - Compagnie Marie Chouinard was awarded by the Imperial Tobacco Foundation's Arts Achievement Award 2010
 2010 - Prix du Québec (Denise Pelletier Prize) awarded to Marie Chouinard
 2015 - Knight of the National Order of Quebec
 2016 - Lifetime Achievement Award, Dance, Governor General's Performing Arts Awards

External links 
 official site
  - official site of the solo gloires morning glories
 Body Remix Goldberg Variationen 2008 arte

References 

(2)Herod, Kena "Marie Chouinard- myth and celebration"
October 2005 Dance Magazine http://findarticles.com/p/articles/mi_m1083/is_10_79/ai_n15966300/

(3)Strini, Tom "Compagnie Marie Chouinard puts body of work on display"
March 25, 2009 Journal Sentinel
 http://www.jsonline.com/entertainment/arts/41716237.html

(4)"The Arts | Dance Review | Chouinard gives "Orpheus and Eurydice" a provocative
twist | Seattle Times Newspaper." The Seattle Times | Seattle Times Newspaper. 15 April 
2009
<https://web.archive.org/web/20110604061532/http://seattletimes.nwsource.com/html/thearts/2008279705_chouinard18.html?syndicati
on=rss>.

(5)"Compagnie Marie Chouinard." San Francisco Performances. 15 April 2009
<https://web.archive.org/web/20090412234012/http://performances.org/performances/0809/CompagnieMarieChouinard.html>.

1955 births
Living people
Canadian contemporary dancers
Canadian female dancers
Canadian choreographers
Officers of the Order of Canada
People from Quebec City
Governor General's Performing Arts Award winners
Knights of the National Order of Quebec
20th-century Canadian dancers
21st-century Canadian dancers
20th-century Canadian women
Canadian women choreographers